Arthus may refer to:

 Arthus reaction, a type of local type III hypersensitivity reaction
 Arthus-Bertrand, a French maker of medals and decorations
 Tangara arthus or Golden tanager, a species of bird in the family Thraupidae
 Le roi Arthus (King Arthur), a 1903 opera by the French composer Ernest Chausson
 A variation of the name Artus

See also
 Artus (disambiguation)